Fredrik Lindström (born 24 July 1989) is a Swedish former biathlete from Bredbyn. He made his World Cup debut on 12 December 2008 in Hochfilzen, where he ended up in 47th place. 

He represented Sweden at three Winter Olympics; 2010, 2014 and 2018. His best result is a victory in the men's relay in 2018. Lindström also won 2 medals individually in the World Championships: bronze in mass start in 2012 and bronze in the individual in 2013.

On 17 March 2019, he announced his retirement from biathlon following the 2018–2019 season.

Biathlon results
All results are sourced from the International Biathlon Union.

Olympic Games
1 medal (1 gold)

World Championships
2 medals (2 bronze)

Individual victories

*Results are from IBU races which include the Biathlon World Cup, Biathlon World Championships and the Winter Olympic Games.

References
IBU Profile

1989 births
Living people
People from Örnsköldsvik Municipality
Swedish male biathletes
Olympic biathletes of Sweden
Biathletes at the 2010 Winter Olympics
Biathletes at the 2014 Winter Olympics
Biathletes at the 2018 Winter Olympics
Biathlon World Championships medalists
Medalists at the 2018 Winter Olympics
Olympic medalists in biathlon
Olympic gold medalists for Sweden
21st-century Swedish people